Laothoe populi, the poplar hawk-moth, is a moth of the family Sphingidae. The species was first described by Carl Linnaeus in his 1758 10th edition of Systema Naturae. It is found throughout the Palearctic region and the Near East and is one of the most common members of the family in the region. It is distinctive due to its habit of resting with its hindwings held further forward than (but still half hidden by) the forewings. 

Adults may be seen from May to September, and do not feed, not having a functional proboscis, and can vary in colour from grey to yellow. The larva is green, feeds on poplar and some other tree species, and pupates below ground.

Description
Laothoe populi is a large (wingspan ), odd-looking species of moth, due to its habit of resting with its hindwings held further forward than (but still half hidden by) the forewings. The species lacks a frenulum joining the wings together, and is said to look like a cluster of dead leaves of the main host, poplar.

When disturbed, the moth will suddenly reveal a bright orange-red basal patch on the hindwing, possibly as a distraction or startle display. The wings are grey marked with darker grey fascia but with the greys occasionally replaced by buffish tones, a form more frequent among females than males. There is a white spot at the distal edge of the cell on the forewings.

Gynandromorphs, half female and half male, are common.

Poplar hawk-moths have been known to produce a hybrid when mated with the eyed hawkmoth, Smerinthus ocellatus; the hybrid has eyes on the hindwings.

Life cycle

One or two broods are produced each year and adults can be seen from May to September. The adults do not feed. The species overwinters as a pupa.

Egg
The egg is large, spherical, pale green, and glossy, and is laid singly or in pairs on the underside of leaves of the host plant. Females lay up to 200 eggs.

Larva
On first hatching the larva (or "hornworm") is pale green with small yellow tubercules and a cream-coloured tail horn. Later, it develops yellow diagonal stripes on its sides, and pink spiracles. Individuals feeding on willows may become quite heavily spotted with red. Others are more bluish white with cream stripes and tubercules.

Pupa
It has a short cremaster.

Adult
Although they emerge late at night or early in the morning, the moth flies starting from the second night and is strongly attracted to light. Having no functional proboscis, it does not feed.

Host plants
Laothoe populi feeds mainly on poplar and aspen, but sometimes on willow, alder, apple, tomato, birch, elm, oak and ash. The food source used by the moth often depends on location.

Subspecies

Laothoe populi populi
Laothoe populi lappona (Rangnow, 1935)

Notes

References

External links

 Poplar Hawk-moth on UKMoths
 Description in Richard South The Moths of the British Isles
 Lepiforum e.V.

Laothoe (moth)
Moths described in 1758
Moths of Asia
Moths of Europe
Taxa named by Carl Linnaeus